Nikos Goulis (born 18 February 1959) is a retired Greek football defender and later manager.

References

1959 births
Living people
Greek footballers
Panelefsiniakos F.C. players
OFI Crete F.C. players
Levadiakos F.C. players
Greek football managers
Panelefsiniakos F.C. managers
Kavala F.C. managers
Trikala F.C. managers
Apollon Smyrnis F.C. managers
A.O. Kerkyra managers
Thrasyvoulos F.C. managers
Ethnikos Piraeus F.C. managers
Kallithea F.C. managers
Ionikos F.C. managers
OFI Crete F.C. managers
A.O. Glyfada F.C. managers
Pierikos F.C. managers
Association football defenders
Footballers from Livadeia